"Earth Angel", occasionally referred to as "Earth Angel (Will You Be Mine)", is a song by American doo-wop group the Penguins. Produced by Dootsie Williams, it was released as their debut single in October 1954 on Dootone Records. The Penguins had formed the year prior and recorded the song as a demo in a garage in South Central Los Angeles. The song's origins lie in multiple different sources, among them songs by Jesse Belvin, Patti Page, and the Hollywood Flames. Its authorship was the subject of a bitter legal dispute with Williams in the years following its release.

Although the song was going to be overdubbed with additional instrumentation, the original demo version became an unexpected hit, quickly outstripping its A-side. The song grew out of Southern California and spread across the United States over the winter of 1954–55. "Earth Angel" became the first independent label release to appear on Billboard national pop charts, where it peaked within the top 10. It was a big hit on the magazine's R&B charts, where it remained number one for several weeks. A cover version by white vocal group the Crew-Cuts peaked higher on the pop charts, reaching number three. More cover versions followed, including recordings by Gloria Mann, Tiny Tim, and Johnny Tillotson.

The Penguins' only hit, it eventually sold in excess of ten million copies. The original recording of the song remained an enduring hit single for much of the 1950s, and it is now considered to be one of the definitive doo-wop songs. In 2005, it was one of fifty recordings chosen by the Library of Congress to be added to the National Recording Registry, deeming it "culturally, historically, or aesthetically important."

Background

The Penguins—composed of lead vocalist Cleveland Duncan, bass Curtis Williams, tenor Dexter Tisby, and baritone Bruce Tate—formed at Fremont High School in Los Angeles, California in 1953. The group named themselves after the Kool cigarette advertising mascot. Williams and Gaynel Hodge were previously members of The Hollywood Flames, where they began writing "Earth Angel" with mentor Jesse Belvin, a Jefferson High graduate. Belvin had previously had a hit single in "Dream Girl", a 1952 ballad credited to Jesse & Marvin (saxophonist Marvin Phillips). The song echoes "Earth Angel" in its melodic refrain: "Dream girl, dream girl..." Its "why-oh" hook was adapted as a background chant within "Earth Angel". The "Will you be mine?" hook was borrowed from the R&B hit of the same name by the Swallows. The Hollywood Flames were hired that year by Jessie Mae Robinson to record a demo of "I Went to Your Wedding", later recorded by Patti Page. Hodge later noted that the group lifted the bridge from that song for "Earth Angel". The song also contains elements of the Flames' 1953 recording of "I Know" in its piano introduction and chord progressions, which were closely based on the Rodgers & Hart standard "Blue Moon". Williams reportedly wrote the song for his wife, Marlene, and Duncan rewrote the melody, as he disliked the original.

"Earth Angel" was recorded as a literal garage demo—it was recorded in a home garage at the Los Angeles home of Ted Brinson (a relative of Williams who had previously played bass for the Jimmie Lunceford and Andy Kirk bands). The home was located at 2190 West 30th Street in South Central Los Angeles. The garage was used as the primary recording space of Dootsie Williams for all of his Dootone artists, and had also been used to record demos for Jessie Mae Robinson. It was recorded on a single-track Ampex tape recorder, owned by big band veteran Ted Brinson, who performs bass on the track. The drums were muffled with pillows so as to not overwhelm the vocals. A neighbor's pet dog stopped many takes by barking. "Everytime the dog barked next door, I'd have to go out and shut him up, and then we'd do another take," remembered Williams. Williams performs piano on the track, with an unknown drummer. Preston Epps reportedly played bongos on “Hey Senorita”(though this unconfirmed). The song is composed in the key of A-flat major and is set in time signature of common time with a tempo of 76 beats per minute. Duncan's vocal range spans from F3 to G4. The first five seconds of the intro are cut off of the recording by accident.

Commercial performance

Although it was an unfinished demo, "Earth Angel" began to see immediate success. Williams carried a rough acetate dub with him to Dolphin's of Hollywood All Night Record Shop, a local record store, to gauge shop owner John Dolphin's opinion. Dolphin broadcast a late-night rhythm and blues broadcast from his store, and KGFJ disc jockey Dick Hugg was sitting in. Hugg played both sides of the single, and by the next morning, requests began coming in for the song. As a result, Williams abandoned an idea to overdub additional instrumentation and began immediate manufacturing of the 7" single to issue it as soon as possible. Still convinced "Hey Señorita" would be the hit, it was pressed to the A-side; disc jockeys soon began flipping the record in favor of "Earth Angel". The demand for "Earth Angel" nearly bankrupted Dootone; producer Walter Williams ran out of label paper, leading the single to be pressed on multiple colored labels. It made its first appearance in Billboard as a territorial hit for Los Angeles, becoming the second best-selling R&B single in Los Angeles for the second week of October 1954. It climbed to number one for the city by November 13, after which it began to grow in popularity in New York, Philadelphia, Cincinnati, Cleveland, Buffalo, Pittsburgh, and Nashville.

"Earth Angel" became the first independent label release to appear on Billboard national pop charts. Billboard called the record a "Best Buy" for the R&B charts, and Cashbox in Canada gave it its "Award o' the Week". It hit number one in New York on November 27, and by Christmas Day the song was placing on the "Best Sellers in Stores" chart for both R&B and pop, where it debuted at number 25. By January 15, 1955, the single had advanced to the top 20 of the overall Best Sellers in Stores chart, resulting in its addition to the "Honor Roll of Hits" chart. It also reached number one on the "Most Played in Jukeboxes" R&B chart. After seven weeks on the chart, it peaked at number eight on the overall Best Sellers in Stores chart, and by February 19 had hit number one on all the major R&B charts. It remained a number one R&B hit for three weeks, before being dethroned by Johnny Ace's "Pledging My Love".

At the time, it was a rare achievement for an R&B song to chart within the top echelons of the pop chart. The Penguins were the first West Coast R&B group to dent the pop top ten. In May 1955, Dootsie Williams was presented with a gold record to celebrate the record selling one million copies (it was reported that nearly 200,000 copies of "Earth Angel" were sold in Southern California alone). With the popularity of the song "The Flying Saucer", the single saw revived sales in summer 1956. When the Penguins switched to Mercury Records, the label reissued "Earth Angel" in September 1956 with string accompaniment. The following July, Billboard reported that the single was again breaking out in certain markets, remarking, "This wax breaks out every summer." It made another appearance at #101 in late December 1959. Indeed, Billboard confirmed the single's enduring popularity in 1960: "The original version of 'Earth Angel,' for example, is still known to be a heavy traffic item in many areas." By 1963, Williams had told Billboard the single had passed the 2,000,000 mark, and it was reported to be the top-selling single of Dootone Records (at this period renamed Dooto). The same year, it was reported that thousands of bogus copies of "Earth Angel" were attempted to be sold by an unidentified counterfeiter.

The song has continued to sell multiple decades after its release; in 1983, for example, it was still selling thousands of copies per week around the world. According to The New York Times, the Penguins' recording of "Earth Angel" has sold over ten million copies. Its exact figures are uncertain; the Honolulu Star-Bulletin wrote that the single has sold "perhaps as many as 20 million records, remaining one of the most popular records of all time."

Legal issues
Group members later engaged in a dispute with Dootsie Williams regarding royalties. By mid-January 1955, the Penguins reportedly did not receive advances from Dootone, and problems began to arise. They hired Buck Ram, a big band-era veteran, to manage the group; he would later take partial credit for the song's success, despite the fact that he only began managing the group after its release. On April 9, 1955, the Penguins signed with Mercury Records. Ram had directed the group to Mercury, slyly using his power as a representative to get another L.A.-based vocal group, the Platters, signed as well. Dootone had previously confirmed to trades that their recording contract with the Penguins spanned three years.  A court decision found this contract was invalid as three of the four members of the group were minors at the time of their signing. Curtis Williams sued Dootone for $100,000, claiming damages as a result of his underage signing. Dootone countersued, claiming Mercury induced the group to break their Dootone contract and for taking the publishing rights of "Earth Angel". Jesse Belvin and supposed co-writer Johnny Green sued the group the same week for not receiving credit for writing the song; all early versions of "Earth Angel" (including the covers by The Crew Cuts and others) showed Curtis Williams as the sole author.

Dootsie Williams sued and was awarded the rights to the song in 1957 by the Los Angeles Superior Court "on the ground that Belvin and Hodge had written most of it."  BMI officially lists the writers of "Earth Angel" as Jesse Belvin, Gaynel Hodge and Curtis Williams.

Cover versions and in popular culture
"Earth Angel" has been repeatedly covered in popular culture. As was a common occurrence at the time, there were a number of cover versions released upon the record's immediate success. Many white artists covered the song, including Gloria Mann, Pat O'Day, and Les Baxter. The most notable of these was performed by a vocal group from Canada named the Crew-Cuts, signed to Mercury Records. Their version peaked at number three on the pop charts, higher than the original. Their version also reached British charts, a feat the original was unable to achieve. Elvis Presley recorded an informal cover during an army stint in  Goethestrasse, Germany. "The Flying Saucer" (1956), widely considered one of the first mashup songs, sampled the song without permission. Other cover versions include Johnny Tillotson, The Cleftones, The Vogues, New Edition, The Temptations, Joan Baez, Bella Morte, Johnny Preston, and Death Cab For Cutie. In Sri Lanka  the popular fm radio channel Shree FM remade a cover version named "Yanna oba yanna" sung by Samitha Mudunkotuwa in early 2000s.

In addition to cover versions, the song has also been employed in various film and television soundtracks. The 1991 film Earth Angel was named after the song. The song has been used in the television series Happy Days. It was featured prominently in the film Back to the Future (performed by Harry Waters Jr. as Marvin Berry & The Starlighters), as well as Superman III and The Karate Kid Part II. It is also used in the jukebox musical Jersey Boys, a musical about the rock band The Four Seasons. It is also briefly in the film version of the play also titled Jersey Boys (film). Australian group Human Nature covered the song on their 2014 album Jukebox.

Legacy
Although the Penguins never matched the success of their debut single, the song has continued to see popularity and acclaim. Cleveland Duncan, the song's lead vocalist, remarked, "I never get tired of singing it, as long as people never get tired of hearing it." The song became a staple of oldies radio in the late 20th century.

An appraisal in the book Singles dubs the song "a simple but elegant recording now judged by many to be one of the finest examples of what would become doo-wop". Despite the higher success of the cover by the Crew-Cuts, the original amateur recording by the Penguins is now considered definitive. Steve Sullivan, author of the Encyclopedia of Great Popular Song Recordings, writes that the track "possesses virtually all of the qualities cherished by doo-wop lovers: melodic beauty, a shimmering earnest lead vocal, stripped-to-the-bone simplicity, and a pristine romantic innocence." The New York Times wrote that "For many the song evokes a glittering, timeless vision of proms, sock hops and impossibly young love", and the Los Angeles Times concurred, calling it a "nostalgic evocation of post-World War II youth culture." Steve Propes, an author and music historian, remarked that "It was the first of the ultra-romantic ballads that hit the nerve of teens at the time ... It stood out because of the sincerity of the delivery."

The Penguins' version was included in Robert Christgau's "Basic Record Library" of 1950s and 1960s recordings, published in Christgau's Record Guide: Rock Albums of the Seventies (1981). Rolling Stone later placed it at number 152 on their list of the 500 Greatest Songs of All Time and called it "a pivotal record in the early development of rock & roll. The artless, unaffected vocals of the Penguins, four black high schoolers from L.A., defined the street-corner elegance of doo-wop."

A 1997 listener poll by New York radio station WCBS placed "Earth Angel" just behind the Five Satins' "In the Still of the Night" in a list of most enduring doo-wop songs. In 1973, Billboard reported that many considered "Earth Angel" among the first rock and roll hits, and The New York Times stated that "its rhythmic, wailing plea to an idealized young woman captured the spirit of the just-emerging rock generation." In 2005, it was one of 50 recordings chosen by the Library of Congress to be added to the National Recording Registry, deeming it "culturally, historically, or aesthetically important".

In July 2016, British rock band Coldplay played the song in concert in New Jersey with Michael J. Fox, star of Back to the Future, on guitar, in a tribute to the film.

Charts

Weekly charts 
All versions

The Penguins version

The Crew-Cuts

Gloria Mann version

Johnny Tillotson version

The Vogues version

New Edition version

See also
 "Blue Moon"
 List of best-selling singles

Notes

References

External links
 

1950s ballads
1954 songs
1955 singles
1956 singles
1959 singles
1960 singles
1986 singles
The Crew-Cuts songs
Bobby Vinton songs
Doo-wop songs
Johnny Tillotson songs
The Vogues songs
Elvis Presley songs
New Edition songs
Aaron Neville songs
Death Cab for Cutie songs
Grammy Hall of Fame Award recipients
Johnny Preston songs
Rhythm and blues ballads
Songs involved in royalties controversies
The Fleetwoods songs
United States National Recording Registry recordings